Cui Yuanyuan (born February 15, 1992) is an archer from the People's Republic of China.

Cui was first selected to represent China during the 2013 season, during which she won medals at the 2nd and 3rd stage of the World Cup, qualifying for the final where she finished 3rd. She also competed at the 2013 World Archery Championships.

References

1992 births
Living people
Chinese female archers